= Darbelo railway station =

Railway station in Pakistan

Coordinates: 27.010147°N 68.1351°E

General information
- Owner: Ministry of Railways

Other information
- Station code: DRBO

History
- Former names: Great Indian Peninsula Railway
Location

Darbelo railway station (Urdu: دربیلو ریلوے اسٹیشن) is located in Pakistan.

== See also ==
- List of railway stations in Pakistan
- Pakistan Railways
